The 2015–16 Arizona Wildcats women's basketball team represented University of Arizona during the 2015–16 NCAA Division I women's basketball season. The Wildcats, led by eighth-year head coach Niya Butts, played their games at the McKale Center and were members of the Pac-12 Conference. They finished the season 13–19, 3–15 in Pac-12 play to finish in eleventh place. They advanced to the quarterfinals of the Pac-12 women's basketball tournament where they lost to UCLA.

Roster

Schedule

|-
!colspan=9 style="background:#CC0033; color:white;"| Exhibition

|-
!colspan=9 style="background:#CC0033; color:white;"| Non-conference regular season

|-
!colspan=9 style="background:#CC0033; color:white;"| Pac-12 regular season

|-
!colspan=9 style="background:#CC0033;"|Pac-12 Women's Tournament

See also
2015–16 Arizona Wildcats men's basketball team

Notes
 March 4, 2016 – The school announced this week that head coach Niya Butts will not return next year

References

Arizona Wildcats women's basketball seasons
Arizona
Arizona Wildcats women's basketball
Arizona Wildcats women's basketball